Alois Wacha (10 June 1886 – 15 June 1946) was an Austrian cyclist. He competed in two events at the 1912 Summer Olympics.

References

External links
 

1886 births
1946 deaths
Austrian male cyclists
Olympic cyclists of Austria
Cyclists at the 1912 Summer Olympics
Cyclists from Vienna
20th-century Austrian people